The Böyük nağara, also called the "kos nağara" or "wedding nağara", is a large double-headed drum. It is played with mallets. The böyük nağara is played in some regions of Azerbaijan. Its body is cylindrical and made from firm wood. Skins are stretched over both the top and the bottom of the cylindrical body of the instrument. Its diameter is 400–450 mm, and its height is 500–550 mm.

See also
Nagara (drum)
Naqareh
Kudum
Dhol
Davul
Qoltuq nagara
Kus

References

Drums
Azerbaijani musical instruments